Leeli is a village in the Alwar district of Rajasthan in India. Leeli is the largest village located in Malakhera Tehsil, with a total of 727 families. According to the 2011 census, children between the ages of 1 and 6 make up 16.85% of the total population. The average sex ratio is 896, which is lower than the Rajasthan state average of 928; the child sex ratio is 875, lower than the Rajasthan average of 888.

Leeli has a higher literacy rate than average for Rajasthan, 67.74% compared to 66.11%. Male literacy stands at 84.23% while the female literacy rate is 49.42%. 
Leeli village is located near Laxmangarh town which is a major town in Alwar district. It was built by Maharaja Lachhaman Singh in 1710 A.D. The leeli village also came under his territory. Thakurs of Leeli were Somvanshi Kshatriyas. Till the end of 19th century they lived the village. Last known Thakur was Late Thakur Shri Bhura Singh Ji, he had two son Shri Laxman Singh Ji and Shri Narayan Singh Ji . As per the constitution of India and the Panchayati Raj Act (which was established on 2 October 1959 in Rajasthan), Leeli Village is administrated by a sarpanch (village head) who is an elected representative. Current Sarpanch of Leeli is Mr.Ramlal.
Alwar junction is the nearest major railway station near Leeli which is around 24 km away 
Leeli is well connected with roadways, and is also near to Rajasthan state highway 44

References

Villages in Alwar district